Interface Region Imaging Spectrograph (IRIS), also called Explorer 94 and SMEX-12, is a NASA solar observation satellite. The mission was funded through the Small Explorer program to investigate the physical conditions of the solar limb, particularly the interface region made up of the chromosphere and transition region. The spacecraft consists of a satellite bus and spectrometer built by the Lockheed Martin Solar and Astrophysics Laboratory (LMSAL), and a telescope provided by the Smithsonian Astrophysical Observatory (SAO). IRIS is operated by LMSAL and NASA's Ames Research Center.

The satellite's instrument is a high-frame-rate ultraviolet imaging spectrometer, providing one image per second at 0.3 arcsecond angular resolution and sub-ångström spectral resolution.

NASA announced, on 19 June 2009, that IRIS was selected from six Small Explorer mission candidates for further study, along with the Gravity and Extreme Magnetism (GEMS) space observatory.

Mission 
IRIS is intended to advance Sun-Earth connection studies by tracing the flow of energy and plasma into the corona and heliosphere for which no suitable observations exist. To achieve this IRIS obtains a high-resolution UV spectra and images of the sun's chromosphere, specifically on the non-thermal energy that creates the corona and the solar wind. IRIS seeks to determine: (1) the types of non-thermal energy which dominate in the chromosphere and beyond; (2) the means by which the chromosphere regulates mass and energy supply to the corona and heliosphere; and, (3) how magnetic flux and matter rise through the lower solar atmosphere, and the role played by flux emergence in flares and mass ejections. To answer these questions, IRIS utilize a single instrument, a multi-channel imaging spectrograph.

Launch 

The launch vehicle was dropped at 02:27:46 UTC on 28 June 2013 (7:27 p.m. PDT on 27 June 2013) by a Pegasus-XL launch vehicle.

Experiment

Interface Region Imaging Spectrograph (IRIS) 
The IRIS instrument is a multi-channel imaging spectrograph with a  ultraviolet telescope. IRIS obtains a spectra along a slit (1/3 arcsecond wide), and slit-jaw images. The charge-coupled device (CCD) detectors has 1/6 arcsecond pixels. IRIS will have an effective spatial resolution between 0.33 and 0.40 arcsecond and a maximum field of view (FoV) of 120 arcseconds. Slit-jaw imaging has four passbands: 133.5 nm and 140.0 nm with a 4 nm bandpass each; and 279.6 nm and 283.1 nm with a 0.4 nm bandpass each. IRIS has a high data rate (0.7 Mbit/s on average) so that the baseline cadence is 5 seconds for slit-jaw images and 1 second for six spectral windows, including rapid rastering to map solar regions.

Science results 

IRIS achieved first light on 17 July 2013. NASA noted that "IRIS's first images showed a multitude of thin, fibril-like structures that have never been seen before, revealing enormous contrasts in density and temperature occur throughout this region even between neighboring loops that are only a few hundred miles apart". On 31 October 2013, calibrated IRIS data and images were released on the project website. An open-access article describing the satellite and initial data was published in the journal Solar Physics.

Data collected from the IRIS spacecraft has shown that the interface region of the Sun is significantly more complex than previously thought. This includes features described as solar heat bombs, high-speed plasma jets, nano-flares, and mini-tornadoes. These features are an important step in understanding the transfer of heat to the corona.

In 2019, IRIS detected tadpole like jets coming out from the Sun according to NASA.

IRIS team 
Science and engineering team members include:
 Lockheed Martin Solar and Astrophysics Laboratory
 Lockheed Martin Sensing and Exploration Systems
 Smithsonian Astrophysical Observatory
 Montana State University
 Institute for Theoretical Astrophysics, University of Oslo
 High Altitude Observatory, National Center for Atmospheric Research
 Stanford University
 NASA Ames Research Center
 NASA Goddard Space Flight Center
 National Solar Observatory
 Space Sciences Laboratory, University of California, Berkeley
 Princeton Plasma Physics Laboratory
 Sydney Institute for Astronomy, University of Sydney
 Center for Plasma Astrophysics, Catholic University of Leuven
 Mullard Space Science Laboratory
 Rutherford Appleton Laboratory
 European Space Agency
 Max Planck Institute for Solar System Research
 National Astronomical Observatory of Japan
 Niels Bohr Institute, University of Copenhagen

See also 

 Explorer program

References

External links 

 IRIS website by NASA
 IRIS website by NASA Goddard Space Flight Center
 IRIS website by Lockheed Martin
 De Pontieu, B., Title, A.M., Lemen, J.R. et al. The Interface Region Imaging Spectrograph (IRIS) Sol Phys 289, 2733–2779 (2014) https://doi.org/10.1007/s11207-014-0485-y
 De Pontieu, B., Polito, V., Hansteen, V. et al. A New View of the Solar Interface Region from the Interface Region Imaging Spectrograph (IRIS) Sol Phys 296, 84 (2021) https://doi.org/10.1007/s11207-021-01826-0

Explorers Program
Missions to the Sun
Spectrographs
Spacecraft launched in 2013
Solar space observatories
Ultraviolet telescopes
Articles containing video clips
Spacecraft launched by Pegasus rockets